"Invitation to the Blues" is a song written by Roger Miller, sung by Ray Price, and released on the Columbia label. In July 1958, it peaked at No. 3 on Billboards country and western jockey chart and spent a total of 19 weeks on the charts. It was the "B" side to "City Lights", and the record ranked No. 4 on Billboards 1958 year-end country and western chart.

See also
 Billboard year-end top 50 country & western singles of 1958

References

Ray Price (musician) songs
1958 songs